Elections were held in the organized municipalities in the Parry Sound District of Ontario on October 27, 2014 in conjunction with municipal elections across the province.

The Archipelago

Armour

Burk's Falls

Callander

Carling

Joly

Kearney

Machar

Magnetawan

McDougall

McKellar

McMurrich/Monteith

Nipissing

Parry Sound

Perry

Powassan

Ryerson

Seguin

South River

Strong

Sundridge

Whitestone

References
Results 

Parry
Parry Sound District